is a public park in the Yahata-cho region of the city of Musashino in Tokyo, Japan.

Overview
 There are 977 trees in the park including cherry, jolcham oak, sawtooth oak, Japanese zelkova, mokryeon, and flowering dogwood. Sasanqua camellia, bigleaf hydrangea, and rhododendron also can be found there.
 Tsuki-machidai, a large, circular, stone bench representing the moon
 Kaze-o-miru-oka, a hill upon which to feel the breeze
 Children’s playground area
 Tennis courts (4, artificial grass)
 Gateball field
 Barbecue square

Access
 By train: 25 minutes’ walk from Mitaka Station on the Chūō Line (Rapid)

See also
 Parks and gardens in Tokyo
 National Parks of Japan

References

 Website of Musashino City (in Japanese)

External links
 Website of Tokyo Metropolitan Park Association (in Japanese)
Parks and gardens in Tokyo